Ragin' Cajuns is an American reality television series that aired on Discovery Channel. The series premiered on January 17, 2012, and ended on February 28, 2012.

Episodes

Cancellation
Discovery reported that only 680,000 viewers tuned in for the series premiere on January 17, leading to the show being quickly cancelled also pending a lawsuit from University of Louisiana for the copyright of the name ‘Ragin’ Cajuns’.

References

External links
 

2012 American television series debuts
2012 American television series endings
English-language television shows
Fishing television series
Discovery Channel original programming